Johann Heinrich Tischbein the Elder, known as the Kasseler Tischbein, (3 October 1722, Haina – 22 August 1789, Kassel)  was one of the most respected European painters in the 18th century and an important member of the Tischbein family of German painters, which spanned three generations.

His work consisted primarily of portraits of the nobility, mythological scenes, and historical paintings. For his mythology paintings his models were mostly members of the upper nobility.

Life
His father was Johann Tischbein (1682-1764), a baker; five of whose eight children became painters. From 1736 to 1741, he studied wallpaper painting and, later, oil painting with Johann Georg von Freese (1701–1775), after which he worked in the service of small princely courts. In 1743, thanks to the sponsorship of Count Johann Philipp von Stadion, he was able to go to Paris and study with Carle van Loo.

In 1749, he travelled to Venice to study with Giovanni Battista Piazzetta, then spent a year in Rome. In 1753, he was appointed court painter to William VIII, Landgrave of Hesse-Kassel. During the Seven Years' War, he fled from the advancing French Army and lived in several locations until the occupation ended in 1762. When he returned, he was appointed a Professor at the new Collegium Carolinum in Kassel.

When he was not teaching, he spent his time at Schloss Warthausen near Biberach an der Riß; an estate owned by his old patron, Stadion. Because of his friendship with Friedrich Gottlieb Klopstock, he also spent some time in Hamburg. He was married twice, in 1756 and 1763, and had two daughters, both by his first wife.

Works

 Resurrection (1763), altarpiece for the St. Michaelis Church, Hamburg, burned in 1906
 Transfiguration (1765), Lutherische Kirche in Kassel
 Passion and Ascension cycle (1778) for the St. Elisabeth Catholic Church in Kassel, now in the Cathedral Museum Fulda
 Kreuzabnahme und Himmelfahrt (1787), altarpiece for the Jakobikirche in Stralsund
 Christ on the Mount of Olives (1788), former Cistercian Monastery in Haina
 Allegory on the Founding of the Kasseler Akademie
 Hercules and Omphale
 May Day at Gut Freienhagen

Portraits
 Self-portrait with his first wife
 The actress Evérard
 The poet Philippine Engelhard née Gatterer
 Landgraf Friederick II
 Princess Christine Charlotte of Hesse-Kassel

References

External links

Works of Johann Heinrich Tischbein @ The Athenaeum

1722 births
1789 deaths
People from Waldeck-Frankenberg
18th-century German painters
18th-century German male artists
German male painters
People from the Landgraviate of Hesse-Kassel
Johann Heinrich
German portrait painters